Wogahta Gebrehiwet (born 11 December 1996) is an Eritrean former racing cyclist. She rode in the women's road race at the 2016 UCI Road World Championships, but she did not finish the race.

Major results
Source: 

2015
 National Road Championships
2nd Time trial
3rd Road race
2016
 African Road Championships
3rd  Team time trial
4th Time trial
 3rd Time trial, National Road Championships
2017
 African Road Championships
1st  Team time trial
9th Road race
 National Road Championships
1st  Road race
2nd Time trial

References

External links
 

1996 births
Living people
Eritrean female cyclists
Place of birth missing (living people)